The Progressive Conservative Party of Prince Edward Island, a political party in the Canadian province of Prince Edward Island chooses its leadership by an open vote of party members at a convention called by the party executive when there is a vacancy in the leadership (or there is an interim leader).

1950 leadership convention

(Held on June 26, 1950)

Reginald Bell presumably acclaimed

1957 leadership convention

(Held on September 17, 1957)

Walter Russell Shaw 524
George Dewar 522

1968 leadership convention

(Held on September 21, 1968)

George Key 691
Cyril Sinnott 474
Ivan Kerry 159

1973 leadership convention

(Held on February 3, 1973)

Melvin McQuaid acclaimed

1976 leadership convention

(Held on September 25, 1976)

Angus MacLean 589
James Lee 437

1981 leadership convention

(Held on November 7, 1981)

First Ballot:
James Lee 581
Barry Clark 348
Fred Driscoll 282
Pat Binns 237

Second Ballot (Binns eliminated):
James Lee 665
Barry Clark 463
Fred Driscoll 281

Third Ballot (Driscoll eliminated):
James Lee 737
Barry Clark 577

1988 leadership convention

(Held on June 11, 1988)

Melbourne Gass 599
Andy Walker 572

1990 leadership convention

(Held on November 10, 1990)

Pat Mella          473
Barry Clark        382
Roger Whittaker    32

1996 leadership convention

(Held on May 4, 1996)

Pat Binns          1,284
 Wes MacAleer       527
Gary Morgan    323

2010 leadership convention

(Held on October 2, 2010)

First Ballot:
Olive Crane 819
Jamie Ballem 692
Peter Llewellyn 94
Jamie Fox 79
Fred McCardle 58

Second Ballot (McCardle eliminated):
Olive Crane 908
Jamie Ballem 604
Jamie Fox 11
Peter Llewellyn 7

2015 leadership convention

(Held on February 28, 2015; vote by preferential ballot)

First ballot:
Rob Lantz
James Aylward
Darlene Compton
No candidate received more than 50% of the vote after the first count; Compton eliminated

Second Ballot (Compton eliminated)
Rob Lantz
James Aylward

2,954 ballots were cast. Vote counts were not released.

2017 leadership convention

(Held on October 20, 2017)

First ballot:
James Aylward
Brad Trivers

2019 leadership convention

(Held on February 9, 2019)

First ballot:
Dennis King 2,014
Allan Dale 746
Kevin Arsenault 590
Sarah Stewart-Clark 527
Shawn Driscoll 307

Second ballot (Driscoll eliminated):
Dennis King 2,071
Allan Dale 803
Kevin Arsenault 661
Sarah Stewart-Clark 601

See also
leadership convention
Prince Edward Island Progressive Conservative Party

References

Carty, Kenneth R., et al., Leaders and Parties in Canadian Politics: Experiences of the Provinces. Harcourt Brace Jovanovich Canada, 1992.
Stewart, Ian and Stewart, David K., Conventional choices: Maritime leadership politics. University of British Columbia Press, 2007.